The dialects of the Bengali language are part of the Eastern Indo-Aryan language group of the Indo-European language family widely spoken in the Bengal region of South Asia. The spoken dialects of Bengali are mutually intelligible with neighbouring dialects.

Bengali dialects can be thus classified along at least two dimensions: spoken vs. literary variations, and prestige vs. regional variations.

Classifications
Suniti Kumar Chatterji and Sukumar Sen classified Bengali dialects in five classes by their phonology and pronunciation. They are:

1. Eastern Bangali dialect: Bangali dialect is the most widely spoken dialect of Bengali language. It is spoken across the Khulna, Barisal, Dhaka, Mymensingh, Sylhet and Comilla Divisions of Bangladesh and the State of Tripura in India.

2. Rarhi dialect: Rarhi dialect is spoken across much of Southern West Bengal, India. It is spoken by almost 20 percent of Bengali people. The regions where it is spoken include the whole of Presidency division (including the city of Kolkata and the Nadia district), the Southern half of Burdwan division and the district of Murshidabad.

3. Varendri dialect: This variety is spoken in Rajshahi division of Bangladesh and Malda division of West Bengal, India (previously part of Varendra or Barind division). It is also spoken in some adjoining villages in Bihar bordering Malda.

4. Rangpuri dialect: This dialect is spoken in Rangpur Division of Bangladesh and Jalpaiguri division of West Bengal, India and its nearby Bengali speaking areas in the bordering areas of Assam and Bihar.

5. Manbhumi dialect: Manbhumi is spoken in westernmost Bengali speaking regions which includes the whole of Medinipur division and the northern half of Burdwan division in West Bengal and the Bengali speaking regions of Santhal Pargana division and Kolhan division in Jharkhand state.

Spoken and literary variants
More than other Indo-Aryan languages, Bengali exhibits strong diglossia between the formal, written language and the vernacular, spoken language. Two styles of writing, involving somewhat different vocabularies and syntax, have emerged :
 Shadhubhasha (সাধুভাষা) is the written language with longer verb inflections and a more Sanskrit-derived (তৎসম tôtshôm) vocabulary (সাধু shadhu = 'chaste' or 'sage'; ভাষা bhasha = 'language'). Songs such as India's national anthem Jana Gana Mana (by Rabindranath Tagore) and national song Vande Mātaram (by Bankim Chandra Chattopadhyay) were composed in Shadhubhasha, but its use is on the wane in modern writing.
 Choltibhasha (চলতিভাষা ) or Cholitobhasha (চলিতভাষা), a written Bengali style that reflects a more colloquial idiom, is increasingly the standard for written Bengali (চলিত cholito = 'current' or 'running'). This form came into vogue towards the turn of the 19th century, in an orthography promoted in the writings of Peary Chand Mitra (Alaler ghare dulal, 1857), Pramatha Chowdhury (Sabujpatra, 1914) and in the later writings of Rabindranath Tagore. It is modelled on the dialect spoken in the districts bordering the lower reaches of the Hooghly River, particularly the Shantipur region in Nadia district, West Bengal. This form of Bengali is sometimes called the "Nadia standard".

Spoken Bengali exhibits far more variation than written Bengali. Formal spoken Bengali, including what is heard in news reports, speeches, announcements, and lectures, is modelled on Choltibhasha. This form of spoken Bengali stands alongside other spoken dialects, or Ancholik Bangla (আঞ্চলিক বাংলা) (i.e. 'regional Bengali'). The majority of Bengalis are able to communicate in more than one dialect – often, speakers are fluent in Choltibhasha, one or more Ancholik dialect, and one or more forms of Gramyo Bangla (গ্রাম্য বাংলা) (i.e. 'rural Bengali'), dialects specific to a village or town.

To a non-Bengali, these dialects may sound or look vastly different, but the differences are mostly in phonology and vocabulary, and not so much a grammatical one, one exception is the addition of grammatical gender in some eastern dialects. Many dialects share features with Sadhu bhasha, which was the written standard until the 19th century. Comparison of Bengali dialects gives us an idea about archaic forms of the language as well.

During standardisation of Bengali in the late 19th and early 20th centuries, the cultural elite were mostly from the regions of Kolkata, Hooghly, Howrah, 24 Parganas and Nadia. What is accepted as the standard form today in both West Bengal and Bangladesh is based on the West-Central dialect. While the language has been standardised today through two centuries of education and media, variation is widespread, with many speakers familiar with or fluent in both their socio-geographical variety as well as the standard dialect used in the media.

Regional dialect differences
Dialectal differences in Bengali manifest themselves in three forms: standardised dialect vs. regional dialect, literary language vs. colloquial language and lexical (vocabulary) variations. The name of the dialects generally originates from the district where the language is spoken.

While the standard form of the language does not show much variation across the Bengali-speaking areas of South Asia, regional variation in spoken Bengali constitutes a dialect continuum. Mostly speech varies across distances of just a few miles and takes distinct forms among the religious communities. Bengali Hindus tend to speak in Sanskritised Bengali (a remnant of the Sadhu bhasha), Bengali Muslims comparatively use more Perso-Arabic vocabulary and Bengali Christians converse in Christian Bengali when engaging in their own circles. Apart from the present dialects, there are a few more which have disappeared. For example, Sātagāiyã' (this is the name used in East Bengal for the dialect of South-western Rarh region). The present dialects of Bengali are listed below with an example sentence meaning:

English translation: "A man had two sons." (M=male indicated i.e. A man had two sons, P= person indicated, without gender, i.e. A person had two sons)

North Bengal dialects

This dialect is mainly spoken in the districts of North Bengal. . The dialects of the North do not have contrastive nasal vowels, tend to conserve h word medially, often go through l-n and n-l transitions, often in nouns, and are the only dialects where æ can be found word terminally.

Dinajpur: æk zôn mansher duikhona bæt̹a/sawal asilo (P)

Sirajganj : æk zon mainsher duido bæt̹a sol asilo. (P)

Pabna (Women's dialect): æk zôn mansher duid̹a bæt̹a/sawal asilo. (P)

Bogra: æk zon mansher duikona bæt̹a/sol~sawal asilo. (P)

Malda: æk jhon manuser duiţa bæţa/chhawal achhilô. (P)

Rangpur: æk zon mansher duikna/duikhona bæţa/sawal asilo. (P)

Rajshahi: æk zon mansher duid̹a bæt̹a/sawal asilo. (P)

Joypurhat: æk zon mansher duikona bæta/sawal~sol asilo

East Purnia (Siripuria): æk jhonar dui chhawal chhil . (P)

Southern dialects

These dialects are mostly spoken in and around the Bhagirathi River basin, in West Central Bengal. The standard form of the colloquial language (Choltibhasha) has developed out of the Nadia dialect.

Nadia/Standard Bengali language: ækta loker duţi chhele chhilo. (M)(একটা লোকের দুটি ছেলে ছিল)

Kolkata: æk jon loker duţo chhele chhilo. (M)

Kolkata (Women's dialect): æk joner dui chhele chhelo. (P)

Howrah: æk loker duţi chhele chhilo. (M)

Howrah (Women's dialect): æk loker duţi chhele chhilo. (M)

Ghatal: æk loker duiţi putro chhilo. (M)

Tamluk: æk bektir duiţi puttro chhilo. (P)

Katwa: kono loker duţi chhele chhilo. (M)

Eastern dialects

Manikganj: æk zoner duiđi saoal asilo. (য়্যাক জনের দুইডী ছাওয়াল আছিলো) (P)

Mymensingh: æk zôner dui put asil. (এক জনের দুই পুৎ আছিল) (P)

Dhaka/Bikrampuri dialect: æk zôner duiđa pola asilo. (P)

Comilla: æk bæđar dui fut asil. (M)
Noakhailla: (Sandwip): ek shôkser dui beţa asilo.(P)

Noakhailla (Feni) (Chhagalnaiya): æk zôner dui hola asil. (P)

Noakhailla (Feni): egga mainsher duga hut/hola asilo. (P)

Noakhailla (Hatia): ækzôn mainsher duga hola asil. (P)

Noakhailla (Lakshmipur) (Ramganj): ekzôner dui hut asil. (P)

Chittagong: ægua mainsher dua fua asil. (P)

Sylhet: exzôner dui fuayn asil. (P)
 Sylheti alternative: exzôn manusher dui fuayn asil. (P)
 Sylheti alternative: ekh betar dui fuayn asil. (M)

Cachar) ækzôn manushór dugua fua asil (M)

South Bengal dialects

Chuadanga : æk jon lokir duiţo seile silo. (M)

Khulna: æk zon manshir dui soal silo. (P)

Bagerhat: æk zon manshir dui saoal silo. (P)

Jessore: æk zoner duţo sol silo. (P)

Barisal (Bakerganj): æk zon mansher dugga pola asilo. (P)

Faridpur: kero mansher dugga pola silo. (P)

Satkhira: æk loker duđi sabal selo.

Kushtia: æk mansher duđi seile silo.

Rajbanshi dialects

Goalpara: æk zônkar dui bæţa asil. (P)

Rangpur: ækzôn mansher duikna bæţa asin. (P)

Jalpaiguri: æk jhônkar dui jhon bæţa achhil. (P)

Cooch Behar: æk jôna mansir dui kona bæţa achhil. (P)

Darjeeling (Terai): æk jhônkar duiţa bæţa chhilo. (P)

Western Border dialects

This dialect is spoken in the area which is known as Manbhum.

Manbhumi: æk loker duţa beţa chhilô. (M)

East Medinipur: gote loker duiţa toka thilo. (M)

Dhalbhum/East Singhbhum: æk loker duţa chha chhilo. (M)

Pashchim Bardhaman district: kono loker duiţi chhele chhilo. (M)

Ranchi: æk loker du beţa rahe. (M)

Midnapore: æk lokkar duţţa po thailô. (M)

Mayurbhanj: akţa loker duţa beţa chhilo. (M)

The latter two, along with Kharia Thar and Mal Paharia, are closely related to Western Bengali dialects, but are typically classified as separate languages. Similarly, Rajbangsi and Hajong are considered separate languages, although they are very similar to North Bengali dialects. There are many more minor dialects as well, including those spoken in the bordering districts of Purnea and Singhbhum and among the tribals of eastern Bangladesh like the Hajong and the Chakma.

Other dialects and closely related languages
This category is for dialects, mostly restricted to certain communities instead of a region, as well as closely related languages. Dobhashi was a highly Persianised dialect originating during the Bengal Sultanate period. The sadhu bhasha was a historical Sanskritised register of Bengali and Christian Bengali was a Europeanised dialect; both of which originated during the colonial period. Examples of heavily Sanskritised Bengali include the Jana Gana Mana.

Dobhashi: "æk adomer dui aolad chhilô." (এক আদমের দুই আওলাদ ছিল।) (M)

Christian Bengali: "æk homor dui putrô chhilô." (এক হোমোর দুই পুত্র ছিল।) (P)

Sadhu bhasha: "kono æk bektir duṭi putrô chhilô" (কোন এক ব্যক্তির দু'টি পুত্র ছিল।) (P)

Heavily Sanskritised Bengali: "æka byaktira putradvaya chhila" (এক ব্যক্তির পুত্রদ্বয় ছিল।) (P)

Assamese: "ezôn manuhôr duzon putek asil" (এজন মানুহৰ দুজন পুতেক আছিল) (P)

Hajong: "ekzôn manôlôg duida pôla thakibar" (একজন মানলগ দুইদা পলা থাকিবার) (P)

Chakma: ek jônôtun diba pwa el.

Kharia Thar: æhôk nôker duiţa chhaoga rôhina. (M)

Mal Paharia Language: æk jhỗṇỗr duiţô beţa achhlæk. (M)

Phonological variations
There are marked dialectal differences between the speech of Bengalis living on the পশ্চিম Poshchim (western) side and পূর্ব Purbo (eastern) side of the Padma River.

Bengali dialects include Eastern and Southeastern Bengali dialects: The Eastern dialects serve as the primary colloquial language of the Dhaka district. This is also true of the Sylheti dialect, which has a lot in common with the Kamrupi dialect of Assam in particular, and is sometimes considered a separate language. The Eastern dialects extend into Southeastern dialects, which include parts of Chittagong. The Chittagonian dialect has Tibeto-Burman influences.

Fricatives
In the dialects prevalent in much of eastern Bangladesh (Barisal, Chittagong, and Dhaka), many of the stops and affricates heard in Kolkata Bengali are pronounced as fricatives.

Poshchim Bengali (Western Bengali) Palato-alveolar or alveolo-palatal affricates চ [~], ছ [~], জ [~], and ঝ [~] correspond to Purbo Bengali (Eastern Bengali) চʻ ~, ছ় ~, জʻ ~, and ঝ় . A similar pronunciation is also found in Assamese, a related language across the border in India.

The aspirated velar stop  , the unvoiced aspirated labial stop   and the voiced aspirated labial stop   of Poshcim Bengali correspond to  [~],  [~] and  [~] in many dialects of Purbo Bengali.

Many Purbo Bengali dialects share phonological features with Assamese, including the debuccalisation of শ  to হ  or খ় .

Tibeto-Burman influence
The influence of Tibeto-Burman languages on the phonology of Purbo Bengali (Bangladesh) is seen through the lack of nasalised vowels, an alveolar articulation for the Retroflex stops ট , ঠ , ড , and ঢ , resembling the equivalent phonemes in languages such as Thai and Lao and the lack of distinction between র  and ড়/ঢ় . Unlike most languages of the region, some Purbo Bengali dialects do not include the breathy voiced stops ঘ , ঝ , ঢ , ধ , and ভ . Some variants of Bengali, particularly Chittagonian and Chakma Bengali, have contrastive tone; differences in the pitch of the speaker's voice can distinguish words. In dialects such as Hajong of northern Bangladesh, there is a distinction between উ and ঊ , the first corresponding exactly to its standard counterpart but the latter corresponding to the Japanese  sound .

Comparison table

Other Eastern Indo-Aryan languages

See also
 Bengali vocabulary
 Bengali phonology
 Arabic dialects
 Punjabi dialects
 Hindi dialects
 English dialects

Notes

References

External links
 Book – Bengali and Other Related Dialects of South Assam

 
Eastern Indo-Aryan languages
Languages of Bangladesh
Dialects by language